Aparna Balan (born 9 August 1986) is an Indian badminton player from Kozhikode, Kerala. She was part of the national team that won the silver medal in 2010 Commonwealth Games, also gold medals in 2004, 2006 and 2010 South Asian Games. She is 6 times National Champion in mixed doubles and 3 times National Champion in women's doubles. She represented India in many international badminton tournaments.

Career 
In 2006, she won the national mixed doubles title partnering with V. Diju. At the same year, she competed at the 2006 South Asian Games and won two silver medals in the women's and mixed doubles event. In 2010 South Asian Games, Balan won the women's doubles gold with Shruti Kurien and mixed doubles silver with Sanave Thomas.

Personal life 
On 09 April 2018, she married Sandeep M S. The couple has a son, Sriyaan Sandeep Maliyekkal.

Achievements

South Asian Games 
Women's doubles

Mixed doubles

BWF Grand Prix 
The BWF Grand Prix had two levels, the BWF Grand Prix and Grand Prix Gold. It was a series of badminton tournaments sanctioned by the Badminton World Federation (BWF) which was held from 2007 to 2017.

Women's doubles

Mixed doubles

  BWF Grand Prix Gold tournament
  BWF Grand Prix tournament

BWF International Challenge/Series (7 titles, 13 runners-up) 
Women's doubles

Mixed doubles

  BWF International Challenge tournament
  BWF International Series tournament

Major National Achievements 
 National champion in mixed doubles 2006
 National champion in mixed doubles 2007
 National champion in women doubles 2011
 National champion in mixed doubles 2012
 National champion in women doubles 2012
 National champion in mixed doubles 2013
 National champion in mixed doubles 2014
 National champion in mixed doubles 2015
 National champion in mixed doubles 2016
 National champion in women doubles 2017
 National games 2015 mixed doubles gold
 Premier Badminton League 2016 winners

References

External links
 

1986 births
Living people
Malayali people
Sportswomen from Kerala
Racket sportspeople from Kozhikode
21st-century Indian women
21st-century Indian people
Indian female badminton players
Indian national badminton champions
Badminton players at the 2010 Asian Games
Asian Games competitors for India
Badminton players at the 2010 Commonwealth Games
Commonwealth Games silver medallists for India
Commonwealth Games medallists in badminton
South Asian Games gold medalists for India
South Asian Games silver medalists for India
South Asian Games medalists in badminton
Medallists at the 2010 Commonwealth Games